This is a list of fauna of the Lower Colorado River Valley in the southwestern United States.

Birds

Insects/arthropods/etc.

Lepidoptera
 Yucca moth

Mammals

Lizards

Snakes

Tortoises
 Desert tortoise

Gallery

See also
 Fauna of the Sonoran Desert
 List of Sonoran Desert birds (Arizona)

 
Lower Colorado River Valley
Lower Colorado River Valley